Ctimene is a genus of moths in the family Geometridae.

Species
 Ctimene abasalis Rothschild 1915
 Ctimene albicolor Warren 1898
 Ctimene albifrons Warren 1898
 Ctimene albilunata Warren 1905
 Ctimene alboguttata Pagenstecher 1896
 Ctimene arybasa Walker 1862
 Ctimene aurinata Walker 1864
 Ctimene basistriga Walker 1864
 Ctimene bistrigata Warren 1896
 Ctimene brachypus Prout 1929
 Ctimene carens Warren 1906
 Ctimene colenda Swinhoe 1902
 Ctimene concinna Warren 1894
 Ctimene conjunctiva Warren 1905
 Ctimene contracta Walker 1864
 Ctimene deceptrix Prout 1931
 Ctimene dependens Warren 1905
 Ctimene detecta Warren 1907
 Ctimene excellens Butler 1887
 Ctimene fidonioides Walker 1864
 Ctimene flavannulata Warren 1899
 Ctimene flavifrons Warren 1906
 Ctimene fulvimacula Warren 1895
 Ctimene hieroglyphica Walker 1864
 Ctimene hyaloplaga Warren 1896
 Ctimene hysginospila Prout 1916
 Ctimene intercisa Walker 1865
 Ctimene interruptata Warren
 Ctimene interspilata Warren 1899
 Ctimene invadens Warren 1899
 Ctimene inversa Warren 1899
 Ctimene lativitta Warren 1902
 Ctimene magata Felder 1874
 Ctimene minor Felder
 Ctimene nocturnignis Holloway 1979
 Ctimene oblongata Swinhoe 1900
 Ctimene obnubilata Warren 1898
 Ctimene obsoleta Warren 1899
 Ctimene ocreata Prout 1922
 Ctimene oppositata Warren 1896
 Ctimene percurrens Warren 1901
 Ctimene perdica Cramer 1779
 Ctimene piepersiata Snellen 1881
 Ctimene placens Pagenstecher 1886
 Ctimene plagiata Walker 1864
 Ctimene pyrifera Warren 1896
 Ctimene quadripartita Walker 1864
 Ctimene radicata Warren 1899
 Ctimene restricta Warren 1905
 Ctimene rubropicta Thierry-Mieg 1915
 Ctimene salamandra Kirsch 1877
 Ctimene salamandra Pagenstecher 1886
 Ctimene septemnotata Warren 1897
 Ctimene spilognota Prout 1931
 Ctimene splendida Walker 1864
 Ctimene suspensa Swinhoe 1902
 Ctimene synestia Meyrick 1886
 Ctimene synestia Turner 1919
 Ctimene tenebricosa Prout 1924
 Ctimene tricinctaria Linnaeus 1767
 Ctimene trispilata Warren 1897
 Ctimene truncata Walker 1864
 Ctimene unifascia Warren 1899
 Ctimene vacuata Warren 1898
 Ctimene velata Warren 1906
 Ctimene vestigiata Snellen 1881
 Ctimene wallacei Felder 1868
 Ctimene xanthomelas Boisduval 1832

References
 Ctimene at Markku Savela's Lepidoptera and Some Other Life Forms
 Natural History Museum Lepidoptera genus database

Hypochrosini
Geometridae genera